Specklinia areldii is a species of orchid plant native to Panama.

References 

areldii
Flora of Panama
Plants described in 1978